Patty Sahota is a Canadian politician, who represented the electoral district of Burnaby-Edmonds in the Legislative Assembly of British Columbia from 2001 to 2005. She sat as a member of the BC Liberal Party.

Sahota was defeated in her 2005 bid for re-election by Raj Chouhan of the NDP.

Electoral record

|-

|NDP
|Raj Chouhan
|align="right"|10,337
|align="right"|46.71%
|align="right"|

|-

|- bgcolor="white"
!align="left" colspan=3|Total
!align="right"|22,128
!align="right"|100.00%
!align="right"|

External links
 Profile at the Legislative Assembly of British Columbia
 Collection of pictures and information about Patty Sahota

British Columbia Liberal Party MLAs
Women government ministers of Canada
Members of the Executive Council of British Columbia
Women MLAs in British Columbia
Living people
21st-century Canadian politicians
21st-century Canadian women politicians
Canadian politicians of Indian descent
Year of birth missing (living people)